Jenn Nkiru is a Nigerian-British artist and director. She is known for directing the music video for Beyoncé's "Brown Skin Girl" and for being the second unit director of Ricky Saiz’s video for Beyoncé and Jay-Z, "APESHIT"  which was released in 2018. She was selected to participate in the 2019 Whitney Biennial.

Early years and education 
Nkiru was born in Peckham, South London. She studied law before moving to the United States, where she attended Howard University and graduated with a MFA in Filmmaking.

Career

Short films 
Her directorial debut was En Vogue, which was shot by Bradford Young and Arthur Jafa was released in 2014. In 2017, Nkiru created a film titled Celebrating Women In Art for the Tate Modern gallery that showcased female contemporary artists in celebration of International Women's Day. That same year, her second movie Rebirth is Necessary was released. This movie was featured on Nowness and won several awards including, the Canal+ Award at the Clermont Ferrand Film Festival and the Best Documentary at the London Independent Film Festival. Rebirth is Necessary was also nominated for the 2018 best short film award at Sheffield International Documentary Film Festival. Her video work is included in the Afrofuturist Period Room exhibition Before Yesterday We Could Fly at the Metropolitan Museum of Art.

Music videos 
Nkiru has directed music videos for Beyoncé, Kamasi Washington and Neneh Cherry. She was the second unit director of Ricky Saiz’s video for Beyoncé and Jay-Z, "APESHIT" . In 2020 she directed the critically acclaimed music video for Beyoncé's "Brown Skin Girl", which won the Best Music Video award at the 2021 Grammy Awards.

Works 

 En Vogue
 Rebirth is Necessary
 Black to Techno
 "OUT/ SIDE OF TIME", commissioned for the Met exhibition Before Yesterday We Could Fly

Awards 

 2018 - Voice of a Woman award at Cannes 
2019 - Aesthetica Art Prize
2021- Grammy Award for Best Music Video for BROWN SKIN GIRL

References

Living people
Year of birth missing (living people)
British people of Nigerian descent
People from Peckham
British artists
Howard University alumni